The smooth softshell turtle (Apalone mutica) is a species of softshell turtle of the family Trionychidae. The species is endemic to North America.

Geographic range
A. mutica is native to North America. It is distributed  throughout the central and southcentral United States as its geographic range extends from western Pennsylvania to New Mexico and south to the Florida panhandle. Smooth softshells turtles inhabit the Mississippi River drainage from Louisiana up to North Dakota and Pennsylvania, as well as the Colorado, Brazos, Sabine, and Pearl, Alabama and Escambia river systems. Two subspecies of A. mutica have been identified. The midland smooth softshell, Apalone mutica mutica, is found throughout the central United States. The other subspecies, Apalone mutica calvata, is found ranging from Louisiana to the panhandle of Florida.

Habitat
Both subspecies of A. mutica are typically found in medium to large unpolluted rivers with moderate to fast currents, but are also found in standing water bodies like lakes, ponds and marshes. They prefer water with sand or mud bottoms, without rocky areas or dense vegetation. Sandbanks must also be present.

Description
The smooth softshell turtle has an anapsid skull. This kind of skull is present among the earliest reptiles and is retained by turtles today. The anapsid skull lacks openings behind the orbits. The smooth softshell turtle has a smooth, flexible and leather like carapace that is covered by skin instead of the hard scutes commonly observed in other turtle species. The plastron is light (white or gray) with no markings, and the underlying bones are visible. Smooth softshell turtles have a tubular snout with round nostrils.

Sexual dimorphism
There is sexual dimorphism between females and males of A. mutica as females are larger than males. Additionally, the female smooth softshell turtle is usually brown or olive-colored with irregular dark brown blotches, while the carapace of males and juveniles is a brown or grayish color with dark dots or dashes. Sexual dimorphism is also apparent in the size of the tails and claws. Males have thicker tails than females, but females have longer hind claws than males.

Similar species
The smooth softshell turtle may be easily confused with the spiny softshell turtle (Apalone spinifera), as the differences between the two species are subtle. The spiny softshell turtle has a rough carapace with spines along the front edge while, as the name implies, the smooth softshell turtle lacks such spines. Additionally, the white chin and throat of the smooth softshell are unmarked, compared to the splotchy chin and throat of the spiny softshell. A. mutica is the only species of North American softshell with round nostrils; all other species have ridges on the nasal septum which make the nostrils C-shaped.

Diet
The smooth softshell turtle is mostly carnivorous, eating aquatic insects, crayfish, fish and amphibians. Although primarily carnivorous, it sometimes resorts to eating vegetation such as algae, vegetables, fruits, and nuts.

Reproduction
Breeding of the smooth softshell turtle occurs from April to June. The mating system utilized by these turtles is polygyny, meaning that males will mate with more than one female. Males actively seek out females by approaching other adults. If the other party is male or a non-receptive female, aggression may be displayed. However, if the other party is a receptive female, she remains passive to the advancements of the males. Copulation usually occurs in deep pools as the male mounts the female. The nesting period is usually from May to July as females only lay eggs once a year. Eggs generally hatch 8 to 12 weeks later with the highest frequency of hatching being between August and September. Male smooth softshell turtles become sexually mature during their fourth year and females become sexually mature during their ninth year.

Female turtles offer prenatal care for their offspring. They produce high levels of non-polar lipids that provide energy for their growing embryos. This energy is more than enough to keep the embryos alive. The high concentration of lipids also offer an advantage at birth as it acts as a food source until they hatchlings become mature enough to commence feeding. This type of care is also known as parental investment in embryogenesis. However, after hatching no physical parental care is given.

Life history
The smooth softshell turtle is the most aquatic of the softshell turtles as it is often referred to as a "swimmer". It is able to stay underwater for extended periods of time due to its long neck and tubular snout. It often buries itself in the sand substrate at the bottom of a river or pool just deep enough so that its snout barely reaches the surface. Additionally, the skin covering the shell allows for a high rate of gas exchange. This enables the turtle to stay submerged for a long period of time. In this position, it often waits for prey to pass and utilizes its long neck to capture the prey.

The smooth softshell turtle hibernates in the months of October to March. It hibernates by burying itself in substrate underwater. After emerging from hibernation, it is often found on land basking in the sun. Given that its shell is a soft shell, it is unable to stay in the sun for extended periods of time. When basking, it is wary of its surroundings, and if any threat presents itself, it is quick to abandon its basking site to seek safety. Its agility on land and water makes it a difficult prey item for predators such as raccoons, humans, alligators and snapping turtles. It seeks shelter from these threats by diving and concealing itself in mud.

Conservation status
Currently, the smooth softshell turtle is considered a species of least conservation concern. However, the species is still facing some wide-ranged threats. These threats include habitat degradation, harvesting for food, and an increase in human disturbances at nesting sites. Additionally, due to its skin's high rate of gas exchange, it is very susceptible to polluted waters. As a result of all of these factors, the smooth softshell turtle has been listed as a species of special concern in Minnesota and Wisconsin.

Subspecies
Two subspecies are recognized, including the nominotypical subspecies.

Apalone mutica calvata 
Apalone mutica mutica 

Nota bene: A trinomial authority in parentheses indicates that the subspecies was originally described in a genus other than Apalone.

Sympatric species
Apalone mutica is sympatric with the spiny softshell turtle (Apalone spinifera) over much of its range.

References

Further reading
Behler JL, King FW (1979). The Audubon Society Field Guide to North American Reptiles and Amphibians. New York: Alfred A. Knopf. 743 pp. . (Trionyx muticus, pp. 484–485 + Plates 268, 269).
Boulenger GA (1889). Catalogue of the Chelonians, Rhynchocephalians, and Crocodiles in the British Museum (Natural History). New Edition. London: Trustees of the British Museum (Natural History). (Taylor and Francis, printers). x + 311 pp. + Plates I-V. (Trionyx muticus, pp. 260–262, Figure 68).
Lesueur CA (1827). "Note sur deux espèces de tortues, du genre Trionyx de M[onsieur]. Geoffroy-Saint-Hilaire ". Mémoires du Muséum d'Histoire Naturelle, Paris 15: 257-268 + Plates 6–7. (Trionyx muticus, new species, pp. 263–266 + Plate 7). (in French).
Smith HM, Brodie ED Jr (1982). Reptiles of North America: A Guide to Field Identification. New York: Golden Press. 240 pp. . (Trionyx muticus, pp. 32–33).
Stejneger L, Barbour T (1917). A Check List of North American Amphibians and Reptiles. Cambridge, Massachusetts: Harvard University Press. 125 pp. (Amyda mutica, p. 124).
Webb RG (1959). "Description of a New Softshell Turtle From the Southeastern United States". University of Kansas Publications, Museum of Natural History 11 (9): 517–525. (Trionyx muticus calvatus, new subspecies).

Apalone
Turtles of North America
Reptiles of the United States
Reptiles described in 1827